Anagonia is a genus of flies in the family Tachinidae.

Species
Anagonia anguliventris (Malloch, 1932)
Anagonia angustifrons Colless, 2012
Anagonia commoni Colless, 2012
Anagonia conformis Colless, 2012
Anagonia crosskeyi Colless, 2012
Anagonia errator Colless, 2012
Anagonia grisea (Malloch, 1930)
Anagonia lasiophthalma (Malloch, 1934)
Anagonia lateralis (Macquart, 1846)
Anagonia latistylus Colless, 2012
Anagonia loripes Colless, 2012
Anagonia major (Malloch, 1930)
Anagonia minor Colless, 2012
Anagonia norrisi Colless, 2012
Anagonia opaca (Malloch, 1930)
Anagonia perplexa Colless, 2012
Anagonia propinqua Colless, 2012
Anagonia rufifacies (Macquart, 1847)
Anagonia scutellata (Malloch, 1930)
Anagonia similis Colless, 2012
Anagonia teratostylus Colless, 2012
Anagonia tillyardi (Malloch, 1934)
Anagonia uptoni Colless, 2012
Anagonia zentae Colless, 2012

References

Diptera of Australasia
Exoristinae
Tachinidae genera
Taxa named by Friedrich Moritz Brauer
Taxa named by Julius von Bergenstamm